Elmo is a Muppet character on the popular children's television show Sesame Street.

Elmo may also refer to:

Given name
Elmo (given name), including a list of people and fictional characters

Entertainment
 "Elmo", a song by Canadian singer Holly McNarland
 Elmo, Alaska, a fictional village which is the setting for the ABC series Men in Trees

Places
Italy
 Elmo, Sorano, a village in province of Grosseto, Tuscany

United States
 Elmo, Kansas, an unincorporated community
 Elmo Township, Otter Tail County, Minnesota
 Elmo, Missouri, a city
 Elmo, Montana, a census-designated place
 Elmo, Texas, an unincorporated community
 Elmo, Utah, a town
 Elmo, Wisconsin, an unincorporated community

Science and technology
ELMO (protein) (Engulfment and cell motility), a family of adaptor proteins involved in cell signalling
 ELMO, Eocene Layer of Mysterious Origin, a red clay layer on Walvis Ridge in the Atlantic Ocean
 ELMO, a mathematical competition in the Mathematical Olympiad Program
 ELMO, election monitoring software available through The Carter Center
 Elmo (shogi engine), computer shogi engine
 ELMo, a word embedding method created by researchers at the Allen Institute for Artificial Intelligence and University of Washington

Other
 El Morocco, nickname Elmo, 20th-century nightclub in the U.S. city of New York
 Elmo (company), a Japanese company best known for their Super 8mm projectors during the 1950s–80s

See also
 Lake Elmo (disambiguation)
 Saint Elmo (disambiguation)
 Telmo (disambiguation)
 San Telmo (disambiguation)
 Delmo (disambiguation)